HaAh HaGadol VIP (lit. The Big Brother VIP) started on March 1, 2009 and ended on March 31, 2009. The VIP season was the second season of the Israeli version of the Big Brother series and the first season of the VIP series. The show follows the main Big Brother rules, but with some changes. For example, in VIP Big Brother the show's duration is shorter – a month (31 Days – like in most of the countries it is aired in). Thirteen celebrity housemates spent a period of five weeks together in the Big Brother House. Housemates include singers, models, a fashion designer, a journalist and other well-known Israeli personalities.

The housemates were not told who the other people who were entering the house would be, but were aware of the predictions that were made in the media, particularly that of Guy Pines which accurately predicted the majority of the housemates.

Details
Hosts: Erez Tal and Assi Azar
Producer: Elad Kuperman
Channel: Channel 2
Company Of Broadcast in Channel 2: Keshet

Housemates

Adi
Adi Neumann is a 26-year-old female model.

Amir
Amir Fey Guttman is a 32-year-old gay singer.(d.2017)

Corinne
Corinne Allal is a 53-year-old lesbian musician and singer.

Daniella
Daniella Pick is a 25-year-old singer. She is the daughter of a well-known Israeli musician Svika Pick.

Dudi
Dudi Melitz is a 27-year-old male model and restaurateur. He was previously engaged to Maya Bouskilla which also participated in the show. He entered to make Maya cause drama and tension. He was the last to enter the house.

Guy
Guy Lubelchik is a 19-year-old model and athlete.

Kochi
Kochi Mordechai is a 34-year-old lawyer. She was married to Israeli politician Yitzhak Mordechai.

Maya
Maya Bouskilla is a 31-year-old singer. Maya was previously engaged to Dudi Melitz, but canceled the wedding in February 2006. She was surprised to see him in the house.

Menahem
Menahem Ben is a 60-year-old literature critic for the Israeli newspaper Maariv.

Pnina
Pnina Tornai is a 46-year-old wedding fashion designer.

Sharona
Sharona Pick is a 28-year-old singer. She is the daughter of the well-known Israeli musician Svika Pick.

Shimi
Shimi Tavori is a 55-year-old singer.

Yossi
Yossi Milstein (born Peter Karpatian) is a 31-year-old publicist. He was the former publicist of Arcadi Gaydamak.

Nominations table

Notes

 Throughout the first week Amir had to judge the housemates during the tasks and pick three housemates to be nominated for eviction. He had to choose the most antisocial (Yossi), the least talented (Dudi) and the most egotistical (Maya). The two most popular housemates nominated for eviction were Dudi and Menachem.
 The Housemates were told that all 8 Housemates who stay in the house would be in the final, but they didn't know that 2 days before the final three of them would be evicted from the house and just 5 Housemates would participate in the final. The voting for the final started a week before the final. At the beginning of the last eviction show, the Housemates were told that 3 of them would be evicted at the end of the program and they were asked to pack their suitcases. After the last eviction, the voting didn't stop, just 3 lines were closed (for those who were evicted) and the voting for the other housemates continued.
 There were no nominations in the final week and the public was voting for housemates to win, rather than be evicted. the housemate with the most SMS votes was the winner.

External links
Official VIP website 

2009 Israeli television seasons
VIP 01
Israel 01